Baranliq, also rendered as Baranlaq, may refer to:
 Baranliq-e Hoseyn Khan
 Baranliq-e Madad Khan